Mirkowice may refer to the following places:
Mirkowice, Greater Poland Voivodeship (west-central Poland)
Mirkowice, Lubusz Voivodeship (west Poland)
Mirkowice, Świętokrzyskie Voivodeship (south-central Poland)